Begungram is a village in Kalai Upazila of Joypurhat District at north-west region in Bangladesh.

Joypurhat District